Charlie Chan in Reno is a 1939 American mystery film directed by Norman Foster, starring Sidney Toler as the fictional Chinese-American detective Charlie Chan, based on an original story "Death Makes a Decree" by Philip Wylie.

Plot
Mary Whitman has arrived in Reno to obtain a divorce. While there, she is arrested on suspicion of murdering a fellow guest at her hotel (which specializes in divorcers).

There are many others at the hotel who wanted the victim out of the way. Charlie Chan travels from his home in Honolulu to Reno to solve the murder at the request of Mary's soon-to-be ex-husband.

Cast
 Sidney Toler as Charlie Chan
 Victor Sen Yung as Jimmy Chan ("Number 2 son")
 Ricardo Cortez as Dr. Ainsley
 Phyllis Brooks as Vivian Wells
 Slim Summerville as Sheriff Tombstone Fletcher
 Kane Richmond as Curtis Whitman
 Pauline Moore as Mary Whitman (Mrs. Curtis Whitman)
 Iris Wong as Choy Wong
 Eddie Collins as Cab Driver
 Robert Lowery as Walter Burke
 Charles D. Brown as Chief of Police King
 Louise Henry as Jeanne Bently
 Morgan Conway as  George Bently

External links
 
Charlie Chan Movie Home on "Charlie Chan in Reno"

1939 films
American crime films
Charlie Chan films
American black-and-white films
Films set in Reno, Nevada
Films directed by Norman Foster
1930s crime films
20th Century Fox films
Films scored by Samuel Kaylin
1930s English-language films
1930s American films